Megalagrion adytum is a species of damselfly in the family Coenagrionidae that is endemic to Hawaii.  Its natural habitat is swamps.

References

Coenagrionidae
Insects of Hawaii
Endemic fauna of Hawaii
Odonata of Oceania
Insects described in 1899
Taxonomy articles created by Polbot